Devil's Dance  may refer to:

Devil's Dance, novel by Saddam Hussein, see Saddam Hussein's novels
"Devil's Dance", song by Metallica from Reload